Keils formerly Kilearnadill is a hamlet  from Craighouse on the island of Jura, in the council area of Argyll and Bute, Scotland. Keils is located on a wide elevated but distinct ridge.

History 
The name "Keils" means "Cell".

Landmarks
On the 1981 OS 1:10000 map there were 18 buildings. Keils Church lies along the A846 road to the south of the village on the way to Craighouse. Alba Cottage, run as a B&B, is also situated on the A846 road.

References 

Hamlets in Argyll and Bute
Villages on Jura, Scotland